Pervane Medrese is a historic madrasa, an Islamic school, in Sinop, Turkey.

It is situated in the center of the Sinop Peninsula. Another  historical building, the Alaaddin Mosque is to the south of the madrasa, across the road between the two.

Background
Mu'in al-Din Sulaiman Parwana, better known as Pervâne, was a vizier during the dissolution period of the Anatolian Seljuks in the second half of the 13th century. In 1262, he recaptured Sinop from the Trebizond Empire. The sultan granted Sinop to Pervane as an iqta, a fief. Although a vassal of the Seljuks, Pervane became de facto ruler of Sinop. He built the madrasa in 1265. After Perwana, the madrasa was used during the Candar beylik and Ottoman Empire. After the proclamation of the Turkish Republic,  madrasas were replaced by modern schools, and the Pervane Medrese was closed. From 1932 on, the madrasa building was used as a depot for archaeological artifacts and ethnographical items collected since 1921. It was established as a museum in 1941, which lasted until 1970 when the museum was moved to its new building. In 2002, the building was handed over to Sinop governorship. It is now used as a souvenir shop bazaar.

Architecture
The building with the dimensions   lies in the north to south direction. A marble portal is the main entrance in the south. There are two rooms on each side of the portal. Five student cells each are situated on both side of the building. In the courtyard, there  is a fountain. The tombs of an admiral (Gazi Chelebi) and his daughter are also at the madrasa.

References

Buildings and structures in Sinop, Turkey
Madrasas in Turkey
Religious buildings and structures completed in 1265
Bazaars in Turkey
Educational institutions established in the 13th century
Tourist attractions in Sinop Province
1265 establishments in Asia